Hainan Tibetan Autonomous Prefecture, formerly known as Tsolho Tibetan Autonomous Prefecture, is an autonomous prefecture of Northeastern Qinghai Province in Western China. Its name literally means "south of (Qinghai) Lake."

History 
The land of Hainan prefecture was originally inhabited by the Qiang and Rong people. During the Western Han it was incorporated in the Chinese dynasties. In 60 BC, Guide County was established, then called Guan County. It was governed under Jincheng (present day Lanzhou).

Demographics 

In 2019, the prefecture had 478,000 inhabitants, with 331,995 belonging to ethnic minorities. The following is a list of ethnic groups in the prefecture, as of 2019.

Administrative divisions 
Hainan Prefecture was established in 1953. The prefecture is subdivided into 5 county-level divisions (5 counties):

Geography 
Hainan is rather mountainous, with the Gonghe basin in the middle of the area. The elevation ranges from 5305 m to 2168 m, averaging 3000 m. The largest lake is Qinghai Lake, and the prefecture is traversed by the Yellow River.

Most of the land, 78.67%, is natural grassland used for grazing. 2.19% is cultivated for agriculture, 4.14% is forest, 6.69% is covered by water and rivers, 0.53% by residential area and industry and the remaining 7.7% consists of barren areas such as glaciers, swamps and desert.

Economy 
Hainan's economy is specialized in animal husbandry, hydropower and tourism.

See also 

 Longyangxia Dam

Further reading 
 A. Gruschke: The Cultural Monuments of Tibet’s Outer Provinces: Amdo - Volume 1. The Qinghai Part of Amdo, White Lotus Press, Bangkok 2001. 
 Tsering Shakya: The Dragon in the Land of Snows. A History of Modern Tibet Since 1947, London 1999,

References

External links 
Hainan Tibetan Autonomous Prefecture Government Website

 
Tibetan autonomous prefectures
Tibetan people
Amdo
Prefecture-level divisions of Qinghai